Ba Dinh may refer to:
Ba Dinh Uprising, a royalist anti-French rebellion that occurred in Vietnam in 1886–1887
Ba Dinh Square, a square in Hanoi, named after the uprising
Ba Dinh District, a district of Hanoi, named after the square
Ba Dinh Hall, former meeting place of the Vietnamese National Assembly (next to Ba Dinh Square)